Palace of the Popes may refer to:

 Apostolic Palace, Vatican City State –  the pope's residence since the return from Avignon in 1377
 Domus Sanctae Marthae, Vatican City –  also known as Saint Martha's House, the Vatican hotel where Pope Francis resides
 Lateran Palace, Rome, Italy –  used from the 4th century until 1309
 Palais des Papes, Avignon, France –  used from 1309 to 1377
 Palazzo dei Papi, Orvieto, Italy –  used from 1262 to 1297
 Palace of the Popes in Viterbo, Italy –  used from 1257 to 1281
 Palace of the Popes in Anagni, Italy –  used from 1227 to 1241, 1296-1303
 Papal Palace of Castel Gandolfo, Castel Gandolfo, Lazio, Italy –  the pope's summer residence prior to 2016, temporary residence of Pope Emeritus Benedict XVI
 Quirinal Palace, Rome, Italy –  used from 1589 to 1870